Nottingham University Conservative Association (NUCA) is a student Conservative association, whose members are drawn from the University of Nottingham. NUCA is affiliated to the University of Nottingham Students' Union, in addition to the Nottingham Conservative Federation and East Midlands Area Council.  The Honorary President is Rt. Hon. John Hayes MP PC FRSA. Past Honorary Presidents include Jonathan Guinness, Lord Carr of Hadley, R. A. Butler and His Grace the Duke of Rutland.

NUCA alumni include many prominent Conservative Party figures. Among them are five current Members of Parliament.

NUCA was inaugerated in 1933, making it one of the oldest union-affiliated societies on campus today, under the name 'Conservative and Unionist Association'. It was briefly called 'Conservative Society' in the 1950s and 'Conservative Future' in the 2000. On 2 November 2015, NUCA voted to disaffiliate from the Party's youth wing, Conservative Future, making it a fully independent association.

Committee
NUCA is run by its officers and committee, who are elected each year at the Annual General Meeting (AGM). NUCA's General Secretary is responsible for running the elections. The responsibilities of each role are set out in the NUCA Constitution. Current committee positions are President, Vice-President, General Secretary, Treasurer, Campaigns and Welfare Officer.

Events
NUCA events and activities vary considerably, depending on the president and committee, but all activities follow four main strands; Port and Policy; speaker meetings; campaigning; and social events.

Port & Policy
NUCA's most popular regular event is Port & Policy, in which a political parliamentary-style debate (chaired by the President) is accompanied by a few glasses of fine port. A typical Port & Policy debate will consist of three predetermined motions selected by the committee, each of which are debated for around 45 minutes with three short intervals. Port & Policy is normally held in The Great Hall, an impressive and historically significant part of Trent Building. Dress code is usually black tie, with occasional reversion to formal wear when alternate venues are used. Port & Policy's attendance has risen sharply in recent years, with over 80 attendees in the final Port & Policy of the 2015/16 academic year and over 90 for the 2017/2018 academic year.

Speaker Meetings
NUCA regularly hosts well known speakers including Cabinet Members and Members of Parliament such as Ken Clarke and Anna Soubry. NUCA also invites a number of speakers from Conservative think-tanks and campaign groups. Controversy occurred in 2022 when GB News presenter Calvin Robinson was invited by NUCA to speak. Plans to protest and occupy the Great Hall, where Robinson was due to speak, by the University of Nottingham Left Society were uncovered which led to criticism from Robinson on his Twitter accompanied by screenshots of the alleged plot. To avoid protests, the event was moved by NUCA to an unpublicised location.

Campaigning
NUCA often campaigns in local and general elections in the constituency of Nottingham South.

In response to the election of the controversial figure Malia Bouattia as President of the NUS,  NUCA was heavily involved in the 2016 'No To NUS' campaign, which sought to disaffiliate The University of Nottingham from the NUS following evidence of institutional anti-semitism, racism and homophobia within the NUS.

Social Events
Social Events often include bar and pub crawls such as the annual Fox Hunt and Oktober Revolution. Traditionally, NUCA members are invited to join together for formal dinners every year, notably for the Christmas Annual Dinner and the Vice-President's Annual Dinner (it is customary for the Vice-President to invite a special guest to the latter). Other social events have included Wine & Cheese Evenings, informal dinners and drinks receptions.

Notable alumni

Current Members of Parliament
 John Hayes, former Minister of State for Transport
 Andrew Bridgen
 Andrew Griffith, Economic Secretary to the Treasury
 Scott Benton
 Gareth Davies
 Katherine Fletcher

Former Members of Parliament
 Neil Carmichael, former chair of the Education Select Committee
 Charlie Elphicke, former Lord Commissioner of the Treasury
 Tim Janman
 Stephen Mosley

Others

 Sir Nigel Sherlock

Magazines 
Over its history, NUCA has published several magazines under different titles. These include Climax: The Blue Magazine (1980-83), Blueprint (1979, 84-90) and Inside Right. There were at least 38 copies of Climax produced, some of which may be found in the Nottingham Manuscripts and Special Collections.

In 2022, NUCA launched The Blue Press, a pro-free speech magazine aimed at fighting back against the perceived left-wing cancel culture that exists on campus. Its first edition was published on 18th October 2022 and included contributions from current and former members of NUCA as well as an interview with the current Chair of Nottingham labour students. The second issue some out in Spring of 2023.

References

Conservative Future
University of Nottingham
Student wings of political parties in the United Kingdom